The sport of association football in the country of Bahamas is run by the Bahamas Football Association. The association administers the Bahamas national football team, the beach soccer teams  and futsal. It is Part of the CONCACAF.

Since 2021 the women's football has an own director for the first time.

Men's League system

Former leagues have been the New Providence Football League and the Grand Bahama Football League.

Women's League system 
In 2016 the BFA started a national League.

Men's National team 
Main article: Bahamas men's national football team

The best men's national team ranking has been 136.

Women's National team 
Main article: Bahamas women's national football team

The best women's national team ranking has been 96.

References